Kristaq is an Albanian masculine given name. People named Kristaq include:

Kristaq Antoniu (1907–1979) (aka Cristache Antoniu), Romanian operetta tenor, baritone, and actor
Kristaq Dhamo (1933–2022), Albanian actor and film director
Kristaq Mile (born 1958), Albanian footballer and coach
Kristaq Mitro (born 1948), Albanian film director 
Kristaq Paspali (1928–2001), Albanian operatic tenor 
Kristaq Rama (1932–1998), Albanian sculptor, art educator and governmental fine-arts administrator

Albanian masculine given names